The Camiguin bulbul (Hypsipetes catarmanensis) is a species of songbird in the bulbul family, Pycnonotidae. It is endemic to the Philippines being only found on Camiguin. 

The Camiguin bulbul was formerly considered a subspecies of the yellowish bulbul (Hypsipetes everetti), but more recent studies have found it to be a distinct species.

Description 
It is described as a large, brown bulbul with a yellowish tint. It is differentiated from the yellowish bulbul as it is generally darker and has drabber yellow coloration. Also has a larger bill.

Habitat and Conservation Status 
This species is only found in lowland forest and secondary growth from 150 to 1,700 meters above sea level. 

IUCN has assessed this bird as near threatened. The population is estimated to number 1,000 - 2,499 mature individuals. Despite its limited range, it is said to be locally common in its range. Currently, there are no major threats to this species.

Conservation actions propose to surveys to monitor population trends and get a better estimate of population size. Investigate whether there may be any potential threats to this species.

References

Camiguin bulbul
Endemic birds of the Philippines
Camiguin bulbul
Camiguin bulbul
Camiguin bulbul